VGG may refer to:

 Volgograd Oblast
 Van de Graaff generator
 Verkehrsgesellschaft Görlitz

 Visual Geometry Group, an academic group focused on computer vision at Oxford University
 A deep convolutional network for object recognition developed and trained by this group.
 Vice Grip Garage, a popular YouTube channel.